Hinsdale is a village in Cook and DuPage counties in the U.S. state of Illinois. Hinsdale is a western suburb of Chicago. The population was 17,395 at the 2020 census, most of whom lived in DuPage County. The town's ZIP code is 60521. The town has a rolling, wooded topography, with a downtown, and is a 22-minute express train ride to downtown Chicago on Metra's BNSF Railway Line.

Geography
It can be reached by highway from Interstate 294 or Interstate 55. The eastern boundary of Hinsdale is I-294, and the western boundary is Route 83.

Demographics
As of the 2020 census, there were 17,395 people, 5,809 households, and 4,817 families residing in the village. The racial makeup of the village was 77.33% White, 1.67% African American, 0.17% Native American, 12.44% Asian, 0.03% Pacific Islander, 1.27% from other races, and 7.09% from two or more races. Hispanic or Latino of any race were 5.45% of the population.

There were 5,809 households, out of which 94.20% had children under the age of 18 living with them, 75.02% were married couples living together, 6.13% had a female householder with no husband present, and 17.08% were non-families. 15.84% of all households were made up of individuals, and 10.23% had someone living alone who was 65 years of age or older. The average household size was 3.30 and the average family size was 2.94.

The village's age distribution consisted of 32.2% under the age of 18, 4.0% from 18 to 24, 18.5% from 25 to 44, 31.7% from 45 to 64, and 13.6% who were 65 years of age or older. The median age was 42.3 years. For every 100 females, there were 102.5 males. For every 100 females age 18 and over, there were 98.0 males.

The median income for a household in the village was $206,701, and the median income for a family was $244,598. Males had a median income of $156,007 versus $56,484 for females. The per capita income for the village was $106,061. About 0.5% of families and 1.9% of the population were below the poverty line, including 0.5% of those under age 18 and 7.0% of those age 65 or over.

Note: the US Census treats Hispanic/Latino as an ethnic category. This table excludes Latinos from the racial categories and assigns them to a separate category. Hispanics/Latinos can be of any race.

Housing and architecture
Hinsdale's downtown area is a National Register Historic District. The downtown area is located in the center of town and is remarkably little changed considering the many teardowns that have occurred over time. There are restaurants, different types of shops, and various services including the primary train station.

The Robbins Park district just east of downtown, bounded by Garfield Street and County Line Road, and Hinsdale Avenue and 9th Street, is a National Register Historic District also. The district includes two of Hinsdale's seven buildings individually listed on the National Register of Historic Places, as well as seven of seventeen Hinsdale Historic Landmarks.

The six individual Hinsdale buildings on the National Register of Historic Places are the Orland P. Bassett House at 329 E. Sixth St., the Robert A. and Mary Childs House at 318 S. Garfield Ave., Immanuel Evangelical Church at 302 S. Grant St., the Francis Stuyvesant Peabody House at 8 E. Third St. and the William Whitney House at 142 E. First St.

Another significant architectural landmark is the R. Harold Zook Home and Studio, which was originally located at 327 S. Oak Street and was saved from demolition in 2005 by relocation to the Katherine Legge Memorial Park, 5941 S. County Line Road.

To address Hinsdale's legacy of important architectural landmarks, the Hinsdale Historical Society runs the Roger & Ruth Anderson Architecture Center, which advocates for the preservation of Hinsdale's historical architecture and serves as an archive and resource.

Government and infrastructure

The village was incorporated on April 1, 1873. Law enforcement is provided by the Hinsdale Police Department. The Hinsdale Fire Department was established in 1893.

The community is served by the United States Postal Service Hinsdale Post Office.

Transportation

Hinsdale is served by Metra's BNSF Railway Line at three stations: Highlands, Hinsdale, and West Hinsdale. Additionally, Pace operates connecting bus services. Currently, Pace bus lines 663 and 668 serve Hinsdale.

Education

Primary and secondary schools
Community Consolidated School District 181 and the Hinsdale Township High School District 86 serve Hinsdale's youth. The high school district has its headquarters in Hinsdale.

The School District 181 elementary schools within Hinsdale include The Lane School, Madison School, Monroe School, and Oak School. Elementary schools in District 181 that are not in Hinsdale include Prospect School, Elm School, and Walker School. Hinsdale Middle School, operated by the elementary school district, is in Hinsdale. Clarendon Hills Middle School, which also is in District 181, is in Clarendon Hills. St Isaac Jogues is a K-8 Catholic Grade School School also located in Hinsdale.

Hinsdale Central High School (formerly Hinsdale Township High School) is located in Hinsdale.

Public library
The Hinsdale Public Library is located in the west wing of the Memorial Building. The library opened in August 1893. The Memorial Building, the library's first permanent residence, was completed in 1929. D.K. Pearson, a director of the library association, donated his house and a portion of his estate to the library system; the donation funded a 1957 addition to the library. 

In 1988, the Memorial Building received an addition on the west side, and the library and the village administration swapped places.

Economy

While many Hinsdale residents commute to jobs throughout the Chicago metropolitan area, Hinsdale is also the home of many small and medium-sized businesses.

Non-profit organizations such as Hinsdale Historical Society and Hinsdale Humane Society are also based there.

Parks and recreation
The lodge, built in 1927, may be rented for private and corporate events such as banquets, meetings, parties, picnics, receptions, and weddings. The park has a clubhouse with meeting rooms, a football/soccer field, a picnic area, playground apparatus, a scenic open space, a shelter, a frisbee golf course, a sledding hill, and four platform tennis courts.

The  Hinsdale Community Swimming Pool is Hinsdale's public pool. The  Veeck Park is Hinsdale's skate park and contains a baseball field, 4 soccer/football fields, a playground, an awning for shelter in case it rains, and a sandbox by the playground. The  Brook Park has a ball field, a football/soccer field, a playground apparatus, and four tennis courts. The  Burns Field has ice skating, a covered picnic area, a playground, bathrooms/warming house, six tennis courts, 2 platform tennis courts, sand volleyball court and basketball court. The  Pierce Park has a ball field, a football/soccer field, a picnic area, a playground apparatus, a shelter, and two tennis courts. The  Robbins Park has a football/soccer field, a playground apparatus, and two tennis courts. The  Stough Park has ice skating, a playground apparatus, and two tennis courts.

The  Brush Hill Area has scenic open space and a sledding hill. The  Burlington Park has scenic open space. The  Dietz Park has a playground apparatus. The  Ehret Park has a shelter and scenic open space. The  Eleanor's Park has scenic open space. The  Highland Park has scenic open space. The  Melin Park has a playground apparatus. The  Memorial Building Grounds has scenic open space. The  Stough Park has scenic open space. The  Washington Circle has scenic open space. The  Woodland Park has scenic open space.

Notable people

References

External links

Village of Hinsdale official website
The Hinsdalean - Hinsdale's community newspaper
The Hinsdale Doings Newspaper

 
1873 establishments in Illinois
Chicago metropolitan area
Populated places established in 1873
Villages in Cook County, Illinois
Villages in DuPage County, Illinois
Villages in Illinois